The men's welterweight event was part of the boxing programme at the 1956 Summer Olympics.  The weight class was allowed boxers of up to 67 kilograms to compete. The competition was held from 24 November to 1 December 1956. 16 boxers from 16 nations competed.

Medalists

Results

First round
 András Dőri (HUN) def. Bait Husain (PAK), PTS
 Kevin Hogarth (AUS) def. Graham Finlay (NZL), PTS
 Pearce Lane (USA) def. Enrique Tovar (VEN), PTS
 Fred Tiedt (IRL) def. Tadeusz Walasek (POL), PTS
 Nicholas André (RSA) def. Lee Shih-chuan (TPE), PTS
 Nicolae Linca (ROU) def. Hector Hatch (FIJ), PTS
 Francisco Gelaberti (ARG) def. Walter Kozak (CAN), PTS
 Nicholas Gargano (GBR) def. Eduard Borisov (URS), PTS

Quarterfinals
 Kevin Hogarth (AUS) def. András Dori (HUN), PTS
 Fred Tiedt (IRL) def. Pearce Allen Lane (USA), PTS
 Nicolae Linca (ROU) def. Nicholas Andre (RSA), PTS
 Nicholas Gargano (GBR) def. Francisco Gelabert (ARG), PTS

Semifinals
 Fred Tiedt (IRL) def. Kevin Hogarth (AUS), PTS
 Nicolae Linca (ROU) def. Nicholas Gargano (GBR), PTS

Final
 Nicolae Linca (ROU) def. Fred Tiedt (IRL), PTS

Tiedt actually received more total points than Linca, but three of the five judges judged him the winner.

References

Welterweight